The California Polytechnic State University College of Architecture and Environmental Design (or CAED) is one of Cal Poly San Luis Obispo's six colleges. Cal Poly's CAED program has nearly 1,900 students and is one of the largest programs in the United States. The college offers bachelor's degrees in five departments, as well as two master's degree programs.

General information
In the 2014 edition of "America's Best Architecture & Design Schools" published by the leading architecture and design journal DesignIntelligence, Cal Poly was rated the No. 1 undergraduate architecture program in the nation. The landscape architecture program is ranked No. 1 in the Western region and No. 4 in the nation.

Departments

Architectural Engineering
Department Head Allan Estes. The Architectural Engineering department is accredited by the Accreditation Board for Engineering and Technology to offer Bachelor of Science (BS) degrees.

Architecture
Department Head Margot McDonald.The Architecture department is accredited by the National Architectural Accrediting Board (NAAB), and offers both Bachelor of Architecture (BArch) and Masters of Science in Architecture (MS-Arch) degrees.  The undergraduate program is a five-year program.  About one in twenty architects in the United States, and one in five in California, are graduates of Cal Poly. The journal DesignIntelligence has continually ranked the architecture program among the top 10 in the nation in its annual edition of "America's Best Architecture & Design Schools. More specifically, Cal Poly's undergraduate architecture program placed sixth in 2007, fourth in 2008, third in 2009, third in 2010, fourth in 2011, fourth in 2012, and fifth in 2013.  In 2014, Cal Poly's program ranked first.

City and Regional Planning
Department Head Michael Boswell.The City and Regional Planning department is accredited by the Planning Accreditation Board and offers Bachelor of Science in City and Regional Planning (BSCRP) and Master of City and Regional Planning (MCRP) degrees.

Construction Management
Department Head Allan J. Hauck.The Construction Management department is accredited by the American Council for Construction Education.

Landscape Architecture
Interim Department Head Omar Faruque.The Landscape Architecture department is accredited by the Landscape Architectural Accreditation Board and offers Bachelor of Landscape Architecture (BL Arch) degrees.

Admissions
For freshmen entering Fall 2017, the College of Architecture and Environmental Design accepted 38% of applicants (805 accepted/2,114 applied); entering freshmen had an average GPA of 3.97, average ACT Composite of 29, and average SAT score of 1314.

See also
Architecture
Landscape architecture
Urban planning
Regional planning
Environmental design
California Polytechnic State University

Notes

References
Cal Poly, San Luis Obispo - College of Architecture and Environmental Design, university-directory.eu

External links
 California Polytechnic State University
 California Polytechnic State University College of Architecture & Environmental Design

Universities and colleges in San Luis Obispo County, California
Buildings and structures in San Luis Obispo, California
California Polytechnic State University
Architecture schools in California
Landscape architecture schools
Educational institutions established in 1948
1948 establishments in California